John Hickey (3 December 1661 – 24 September 1723) was an Anglican priest.

Hickey was born in County Tipperary and educated at Trinity College, Dublin. 
 He was Chancellor of Cashel Cathedral and Archdeacon of Emly from 1682 until his death.

References

Archdeacons of Emly
Alumni of Trinity College Dublin
17th-century Irish Anglican priests
18th-century Irish Anglican priests
1661 births
1723 deaths
People from County Tipperary